"Switch Me On" is the first single released from Shannon Noll's fourth studio album, A Million Suns (2011). "Switch Me On" debuted at number 45 on the Australian ARIA Singles Chart before peaking at number 42 on 16 October 2011.

Official versions
 CD single
 "Switch Me On" - 3:26
 "What Ya Made Of"  (Demo)  - 3:30

Charts

References

2011 songs
2011 singles
Shannon Noll songs
Universal Music Australia singles